Ouville is a commune in the Manche department in Normandy in north-western France.

History
Ouf'''s farm. Ouf from the Norse Ulfr'' (wolf), which survives in the Norman surname Ouf, common in the region of le Havre.

Heraldry

References

See also
Communes of the Manche department

Communes of Manche